IFK Stockholm Bandy was the bandy team of IFK Stockholm from Stockholm, Sweden. They lost the final of the 1910 Swedish Championship to IFK Uppsala with 2–0.

Honours

Domestic
 Swedish Champions:
 Runners-up (1): 1910

References

Sport in Stockholm
Bandy clubs in Sweden